The Maryland and Delaware Railroad Company  is a Class III short-line railroad, formed in 1977 to operate several branch lines of the former Penn Central Railroad in both Maryland and Delaware, United States. These branches were omitted from the system plan for Conrail in 1976 and would have been discontinued without state subsidies. As an alternative to the higher cost of subsidizing Conrail as the operator of the branch lines, the Maryland and Delaware governments selected the Maryland and Delaware Railroad Company (MDDE) to serve as the designated operator.

The railroad did not own any of the track it uses until 2000 when it acquired a line between Frankford, Delaware and Snow Hill, Maryland, from the Snow Hill Shippers Association.  Today, the railroad operates on 92 miles of track and runs out of a restored station in Federalsburg, Maryland. The new engine house in Massey, MD, was opened in the fall of 2019.

History
MDDE was incorporated in the State of Maryland on June 20, 1977, as a closely held, small railroad company. At that time, the states of Maryland and Delaware were paying subsidies to Conrail for branch lines, still owned by Penn Central, serving rural communities.

The Maryland Department of Transportation selected MDDE to operate three of the rural branch lines in August 1977. These included the current Northern and Seaford Lines, and the discontinued branch between Clayton, Delaware and Easton, Maryland. Maryland purchased the two branches served by the MDDE Northern and Seaford Lines.

Snow Hill Shippers Association purchased the branch currently known as the Snow Hill Line in 1982 and hired MDDE to serve as operator.  MDDE became the owner of the branch in 2000.

MDDE was awarded a five-year contract by Delaware in 1994 to operate a branch between Ellendale, Delaware and Milton, Delaware, and another branch between Georgetown, Delaware and Lewes, Delaware. These branches were part of the former Queen Anne's Railroad, which began providing rail service between Queenstown, Maryland and Lewes, Delaware in 1894, and extended its track to Love Point, Maryland in 1902. MDDE did not seek renewal of the Delaware contract and the operation of the two lines was returned to the previous contractor, Delaware Coast Line Railroad, in 1999.

The 5-year operating contract with the Maryland Department of Transportation for the North Line and Seaford Line became effective in 2008. Two 5-year renewal options allow the contract to be extended until 2023.

After years of using part of the Snow Hill branch for tank car storage, active rail service was restored in June 2019 to the Tysons Foods facility.

Lines operated
The Maryland and Delaware Railroad operates on three segments of track throughout the Delmarva Peninsula. Each segment intersects the Delmarva Central Railroad, which interchanges with the Norfolk Southern Railway in Clayton, Delaware.
The Northern Line intersects the Delmarva Central Railroad in Townsend, Delaware and heads west towards Massey, Maryland, where the line splits into two branches, one destined for Chestertown, Maryland and Worton, Maryland, the other destined for Centreville, Maryland.
The Seaford Line intersects the Delmarva Central Railroad in Seaford, Delaware and continues west towards Cambridge, Maryland, passing through Federalsburg, Maryland and Hurlock, Maryland.
The Snow Hill Line intersects the Delmarva Central Railroad in Frankford, Delaware and continues south towards Snow Hill, Maryland.

Hurlock Express
MDDE provides an engine for the "Hurlock Express" at the annual Hurlock Fall Festival. Train rides during the one-day event, held on the first Saturday of October, run from the town of Hurlock's historic train station (built in 1867) to Federalsburg, along the MDDE's Seaford Line. The town of Hurlock owns the train station and two passenger cars.

In 1892 Hurlock became the intersection of the Delaware Railroad and the Baltimore, Chesapeake and Atlantic Railway, which are no longer operating. The MDDE's Seaford Line is the only rail line now serving the town. Except for the Hurlock Fall Festival, MDDE does not provide passenger service.

References

Delaware railroads
Maryland railroads
Spin-offs of Conrail